George Ernest Hansen (April 22, 1934 – July 6, 2017) was a Canadian football player who played for the Calgary Stampeders. He previously played at the University of Georgia. He was included on the Stampeders' Wall of Fame in 1999. 

Hansen died on July 6, 2017 at age 83.

References

1934 births
2017 deaths
Players of Canadian football from Alberta
Canadian football tackles
American football tackles
Canadian players of American football
Georgia Bulldogs football players
Calgary Stampeders players
Canadian football people from Calgary